The Last Fight is the fourth studio album between Willie Colón and Rubén Blades released by Fania Records in 1982. It is the soundtrack to the film The Last Fight starring Rubén Blades in his film acting debut.

Background
The Last Fight was the last of four collaborative albums produced by Rubén Blades and Willie Colón. Rubén Blades once cited this as his least favorite effort of his musical career. Blades remarked to Billboard Magazine in the 10 July 1982 edition that his musical partnership with Willie Colón would end that year.

Reception
Generally considered the least successful of the Rubén Blades/Willie Colón collaborations, the album has been better received by newer generations.

Track listing

Personnel
Producers:
 Ruben Blades
 Willie Colón
Executive Producer:
 Jerry Masucci
Engineers:
 Jon Fausty
 Willie Colón
Mixing:
 Jon Fausty
 Willie Colón
Arrangers:
 Luis Cruz
 Jay Chattaway
 Rubén Blades
 Willie Colón
Musicians:
 Rubén Blades - Vocals
 Willie Colón - Trombone, Vocals
 Eddie Resto - Bass (Electric), Guitar (Bass)
 Leopoldo Pineda - Trombone
 Luis Lopez - Trombone
 Jimmy Delgado - Timbales
 Johnny Andrews - Bongos, Cowbell
 Luis Antonio Lopez - Trombone
 Milton Cardona - Percussion, Conga, Choir, Chorus
Composers:
 Jaime Sabater
 Edmundo Souto
 Pedro Flores
 Paulinho Tapajós
 Danilo Caymmi
Liner Notes:
 Ernesto Lechner
Photographer, Artwork & Design:
 Ron Levine
Graphic Design:
 Louise Hilton
Editing:
 Richie Viera
Concept & Artistic Directors:
 Rubén Blades
 Willie Colón

References

1982 albums
Fania Records albums
Willie Colón albums
Rubén Blades albums
Salsa albums